South Carolina Public Radio (SCPR) is the National Public Radio member network serving the state of South Carolina.  It is operated by the South Carolina Educational Television Commission, an agency of the South Carolina state government.  It is a sister network to South Carolina Educational Television.

The network's primary operations are located on George Rogers Boulevard in Columbia, across from Williams-Brice Stadium.  Satellite studios are located in Spartanburg, Beaufort, Sumter and Rock Hill.

The network's eight stations provide at least secondary coverage to nearly all of South Carolina, plus portions of North Carolina and Georgia.

History
The Educational Television Commission had its mission broadened to include radio in the late 1960s.  In 1972, WEPR in Clemson (now in Greenville) signed on the air as the state's first public radio station.  Seven more transmitters signed on in the 1970s and 1980s.

Until 2001, the stations were known as the "South Carolina Educational Radio Network," airing a mix of classical music and NPR news and talk.  However, since much of the state gets grade B coverage from at least two full NPR member stations, the ETV Commission opted to split the radio stations into two networks.  Four stations continued to air a mix of classical music and NPR programming, while three aired an expanded schedule of NPR news and talk.  The eighth station, WNSC-FM in Rock Hill, began airing exclusively jazz music in order to avoid programming duplication with WFAE in Charlotte.

In 2003, SCERN rebranded as "ETV Radio" in order to link the radio stations more closely with their television sisters.

In 2009, ETV Radio began streaming both the Classical and News networks on the Internet; prior to this, it had been one of the few NPR members not to offer live streaming online.

In 2011, listeners gave $1.5 million in donations toward the construction of a new studio facility, which opened in April 2013.

In August 2015, ETV president Linda O'Byron announced that in response to a listener survey, ETV Radio would rebrand as South Carolina Public Radio.  The name change took full effect in September.

Network 
South Carolina Public Radio consists of eight FM transmitters.  Three of these stations broadcast a mix of NPR information programs and classical music; five of them broadcast strictly NPR news and information programming. However, all these stations simulcast NPR's more popular shows, such as Morning Edition and All Things Considered.

News/classical service

News/talk service 

When the ETV Commission split its offerings into a two-channel network in 2001, WJWJ was the first to split off later that year.  Nearly all of its coverage area also receives classical music programming from WSVH in Savannah, and it offers at least grade B coverage to most of the Charleston area. WRJA came next later in 2001 since much of its coverage area overlaps WLTR.  WHMC followed in late 2001, with WLJK joining in 2003.

On July 1, 2008, WNSC-FM joined the NPR News radio service. Then-SCETV president Moss Bresnahan told the Charlotte Observer that SCETV did not want to deny listeners on the South Carolina side of the Charlotte market access to SCETV's growing slate of local programming. The move left the Charlotte market without a jazz station of its own. Ironically, WNSC was the Charlotte area's first NPR station when it signed on in 1979; WFAE did not sign on until 1981.  Presently, the only area of the state that does not receive grade B coverage from two NPR stations is WEPR's coverage area in the Upstate. Recently, ETV Radio added a simulcast of its all-news format on WSCI's second HD subcarrier in order to improve reception for that format in Charleston.

Until the rebranding as ETV Radio, WJWJ, WSCI and WEPR aired occasional local programs from ETV's studios in Beaufort, Charleston and Greenville. Due to budget cuts and the creation of the two networks, all stations now are fed programming directly from Columbia, although ETV/South Carolina Public Radio maintains several local offices.

Radio programming

Chamber Music from the Spoleto Festival
Piano Jazz
Piano Jazz Rising Stars
Song Travels with Michael Feinstein
Walter Edgar's JournalYour Day (produced by Clemson University Radio Productions)On The Keys with David KiserSonatas and Soundscapes''

References

External links
Official site

NPR member networks
Educational and instructional television channels